A Number may refer to:

 A Number (Play)
 Number (Mathematical object)
 A-Number (Telephony)

Disambiguation pages